Ananda Mikola (born 27 April 1980 in Jakarta) is an Indonesian racecar driver.

Mikola competed in the Italian and International Formula 3000 series from 1999 to 2001 and was champion of Asian F3 in the 2005 season. He was out of racing for a couple of seasons before driving for A1 Team Indonesia in A1GP. As of the 2 April race in Shanghai, he had scored a best finish of fifth. In the World Series Lights he raced for a team sponsored by AC Milan Football Club. Ananda is the brother of another Indonesian driver, Moreno Soeprapto.

Racing history

Career summary

References

1980 births
Living people
Sportspeople from Jakarta
Indonesian racing drivers
A1 Team Indonesia drivers
Auto GP drivers
Formula V6 Asia drivers
Italian Formula Three Championship drivers
Asian Formula Three Championship drivers
International Formula 3000 drivers
Speedcar Series drivers
Superstars Series drivers

Eurasia Motorsport drivers
Team Astromega drivers
RC Motorsport drivers
21st-century Indonesian people